Adventures in Time (subtitle A Concerto for Orchestra arranged by Johnny Richards) is an album by the Stan Kenton Orchestra featuring compositions by Johnny Richards recorded in 1962 and released by Capitol Records.

Reception

The Allmusic review by Scott Yanow noted "none of the songs are all that memorable by themselves. This worthwhile if not particularly essential release is a bit of a historical curiosity". On All About Jazz William Grim was more enthusiastic writing "Out of the entire recorded oeuvre of the Stan Kenton Orchestra, Adventures in Time is one of the most adventurous and musically satisfying records. ...While some critics have derided this album as bombastic and unjazzlike, Kenton and Richards were aiming for much more than the typical fare for a big band. What the Modern Jazz Quartet did in synthesizing the jazz combo and European chamber music, Kenton was doing in combining the big band with the complexities and sonorities of the traditional European orchestra. ...Adventures in Time sounds as breathtakingly modern today as it did when it was first released over forty years ago".

Track listing
All compositions by Johnny Richards.
 "Commencement" - 3:07
 "Quintile" - 6:58
 "Artemis" - 5:33
 "3 x 3 x 2 x 2 x 2 = 72" - 4:27
 "March to Polaris" - 5:52
 "Septuor from Antares" - 3:51
 "Artemis and Apollo" - 4:32
 "Apercu" - 3:54		
Recorded at Capitol Studios in Hollywood, CA on September 24, 1962 (track 1), September 25, 1962 (track 2), September 26, 1962 (tracks 3-5), September 27, 1962 (tracks 6 & 7) and September 28, 1962 (track 8).

Personnel
Stan Kenton - piano
Bob Behrendt, Keith La Motte, Gary Slavo, Dalton Smith, Marvin Stamm - trumpet
Bob Fitzpatrick, Bud Parker, Tom Ringo - trombone
Jim Amlotte - bass trombone
Dave Wheeler - bass trombone, tuba
Joe Burnett, Dwight Carver, Lou Gasca, Ray Starling - mellophone
Gabe Baltazar - alto saxophone
Ray Florian, Don Menza,  tenor saxophone
Allan Beutler - baritone saxophone
Joel Kaye - baritone saxophone, bass saxophone
Bucky Calabrese - bass 
Dee Barton - drums 
Steve Dweck - tympani, percussion
Johnny Richards - arranger, conductor

References

Stan Kenton albums
1962 albums
Capitol Records albums
Albums conducted by Stan Kenton

Albums recorded at Capitol Studios
Albums produced by Lee Gillette